"2 Be Loved (Am I Ready)" is a song by American singer and rapper Lizzo, from her fourth studio album Special (2022). It was released to Italian radio on July 18, 2022, as the album's second single, while in the United States, it impacted hot adult contemporary radio on August 1, 2022, as well as rhythmic contemporary radio and contemporary hit radio the following day.  "2 Be Loved (Am I Ready) is a "new wave-ish" pop song, inspired by 70's disco and 80's synth-pop, and has been compared to works by The Pointer Sisters and Hall & Oates.

Chart performance 
Commercially, the song has so far peaked at number 11 in Australia, 25 in Canada, 76 in France, 16 in the UK, and 55 in the US.

Live performances 
Lizzo performed the song for the first time on Today on July 15, 2022. She performed the song in a medley with previous single "About Damn Time" at the 2022 MTV Video Music Awards.

Music video 
To promote "2 Be Loved", a music video for the song premiered on August 15, 2022, serving as a continuation of the "Truth Hurts" music video, which was released in 2017.

Charts

Weekly charts

Year-end charts

Certifications

Release history

References

2022 songs
2022 singles
Lizzo songs
Atlantic Records singles
Songs written by Lizzo
Songs written by Max Martin
Songs written by Ilya Salmanzadeh
Songs written by Savan Kotecha
Songs written by Peter Svensson